Gladstone School District is a four-school public school district serving Gladstone, Oregon, United States. The superintendent is Bob Stewart.

Demographics
In the 2021-22 school year, the district served 1,778 students:
1%   American Indian/Alaska Native; 
1%   Asian; 
1%   Black/African American;
16% Hispanic/Latino;
1%   Native Hawaiian/Pacific Islander;
7%   Multiracial;
72% White;
13% Students with Disabilities;
42% Economically Disadvantaged;
10%   English Learners.

Schools

The district's schools are the Gladstone Center for Children and Families [kindergarten], John Wetten Elementary School [grades 1-5], Kraxberger Middle School [grades 6 to 8],and [[Gladstone High School [grades 9 to 12]. (Oregon)|Gladstone High School]]. The four schools have a total of 1,778 students.

Gladstone school bond
A school bond was passed for the Gladstone School District during the November 2006 general election. The estimated cost of the construction was $40,000,000. The money was used to help all schools in the district, however, the majority of the money funded renovations and expansion of Gladstone High School.

References

External links 
 Gladstone School District (official website)

Gladstone, Oregon
School districts in Oregon
Education in Clackamas County, Oregon